Sir David Edward Reid (born 5 February  1947) is a British businessman and chartered accountant. He was until 2011 the chairman of Tesco, Britain's largest supermarket chain.

Early life
Educated at Fettes College and Aberdeen University,

Career
Reid qualified as a chartered accountant with Peat Marwick Mitchell in 1970.

He was appointed chief accountant for Philips Video and then for International Stores before becoming finance director of Tesco in 1985. He became deputy chairman of Tesco in 1996 and chairman in 2004.

He is also a non-executive director of Reed Elsevier and chairman of Kwik-Fit. He was previously a non-executive director of Legal & General, Westbury and De Vere Group.

Charitable work
He is a director of the Tesco Charity Trust which spends circa £5m per annum on good causes. He is chairman of Whizz-Kidz, a charity which seeks to help disabled children.

Honours
Reid was knighted in the 2012 New Year Honours for services to business and charity.

References

1947 births
Living people
Scottish accountants
People educated at Fettes College
Alumni of the University of Aberdeen
British businesspeople in retailing
Chairmen of Tesco
Tesco people
Knights Bachelor
Scottish chairpersons of corporations
Businesspeople awarded knighthoods